Mirza Hasan Kandi (also Romanized as Mīrzā Ḩasan Kandī) is a village in Salavat Rural District, Moradlu District, Meshgin Shahr County, Ardabil Province, Iran. At the 2006 census, its population was 202, in 48 families.

References 

Towns and villages in Meshgin Shahr County